Passion hymns are hymns dedicated to the Passion of Jesus. They are often sung during Passiontide, namely for Maundy Thursday and Good Friday. Many of them were used as chorales in Passions, such as Bach's St John and St Matthew Passion.

List of Passion hymns

References

 
Holiday songs lists